Okosieme is a surname. Notable people with the surname include:

Ndubuisi Okosieme (born 1966), Nigerian footballer 
Nkiru Okosieme (born 1972), Nigerian footballer

Surnames of Nigerian origin